The AFC Youth Championship 2004 qualification was held in 15 places in 2003, Malaysia with 15 qualified teams advanced to the final phase.

Qualification Stage

Group A

All matches played in Qatar.

Group B

All matches played in Jordan.

Group C

All matches played in Syria.

Group D

All matches played in Yemen.

Group E

All matches played in Bangladesh.

Group F

All matches played in Uzbekistan.

Group G

All matches played in Iran.

Group H

All matches played in Turkmenistan. 

  qualified, but later withdrew, India replaced.

Group I

All matches played in Vietnam.

Group J

All matches played in Laos.

Group K

All matches played in Indonesia.

Group L

All matches played in Singapore.

Group M

All matches played in Japan.

Group N

All matches played in South Korea.

Group O

All matches played in China.

References
RSSSF

AFC U-19 Championship qualification
2004 in Asian football